ONA was a vegan restaurant in Arès, France owned by chef Claire Vallée and was the first vegan restaurant to receive a Michelin star. The name stands for origine non-animale and the restaurant uses no animal products in its food, decorations or furnishings. ONA was opened in 2016 by Vallée, a self-taught chef, and offered a seven-course tasting menu. 95% of its clientele was neither vegan nor vegetarian, the chef said in 2021. The restaurant closed permanently in October 2022.

History 
Vallée opened the restaurant using loans from ethical bank  and crowdfunding. The Michelin Guide for 2021 awarded ONA one Michelin star, a first among vegan restaurants. ONA was also one of 33 restaurants in France to receive a Green Star, a new category by the Michelin Guide awarded for sustainable practices. In 2018, the restaurant had been awarded a Michelin Fork.

References

Vegan restaurants
French restaurants in France
Michelin Guide starred restaurants in France